Wasted…Again is an album released by American hardcore punk band Black Flag in 1987 on SST Records. It is a "best-of" compilation released after Black Flag's breakup in 1986.

In 2005, Spin magazine would name it one of "The Ten Greatest Compilations Of The Spin Era".

Track listing
All tracks written by Greg Ginn except where noted

Personnel
Keith Morris – vocals on 1, 4–5, 10
Ron Reyes – vocals on 6
Dez Cadena – vocals on 3, 11, rhythm guitar on 2
Henry Rollins – vocals on 2, 7–9, 12
Greg Ginn – lead guitar on all tracks
Chuck Dukowski – bass on 1–6, 10–11
Kira Roessler – bass on 7–9, 12
Brian Migdol – drums on 1, 4–5, 10
ROBO – drums on 2–3, 6, 11
Bill Stevenson – drums on 7–9, 12

References 

Black Flag (band) compilation albums
1987 compilation albums
SST Records compilation albums